Asi Vassihon (born 31 July 1982) is an Israeli footballer playing for F.C. Ironi Ariel.

Career
Vassihon immigrated to Israel in 1989 and began playing in the youth department of Maccabi Netanya until the season 2001-02, when he was chosen to the senior squad of Maccabi Netanya.

In 2006, he was loaned to Hapoel Nazareth Illit, then in the Liga Leumit, for one season, a loan that was later prolonged for two years. Vassihon was published, negatively, because of suspicion over selling games in the 2006-07 season. However, the affair ended as it began, and Vassihon was cleared of any wrongdoing.

In September 2009 he signed for Hapoel Kfar Saba. He played there for two and a half years until he got injured and was released from his contract in the end of 2011.

In January 2013 he returned to play football as he signed for Maccabi Kiryat Gat in Liga Alef.

International career
Vassihon has represented his country as he won 6 caps in the Israel national under-21 football team, the first of which was on 29 January 2003, against Turkey.

Club career statistics
(correct as of April 2013)

Honours
Toto Cup (Leumit):
Winner (1): 2004-05
Liga Leumit:
Runner-up (1): 2004-05

References

External links
 Profile at One.co.il
 
 

1982 births
Living people
Ethiopian Jews
Ethiopian emigrants to Israel
Citizens of Israel through Law of Return
Israeli footballers
Maccabi Netanya F.C. players
Hapoel Nof HaGalil F.C. players
Hapoel Kfar Saba F.C. players
Maccabi Kiryat Gat F.C. players
Israeli Premier League players
Liga Leumit players
Footballers from Netanya
Association football midfielders